Jake's Progress is the second album by Jake Thackray. It was recorded at Abbey Road Studios, produced by Norman Newell, and released on LP by EMI in 1968. The album is currently out of print, but its songs, digitally remastered, are included in the four-CD retrospective Jake in a Box, which also includes alternate versions of eight of the songs – "Left on the Shelf" (in the first person, rather than, as on the album, the third), "The Blacksmith and the Toffee-Maker", "Family Tree", "One-Eyed Isaac", "Grandad", "Salvation Army Girl", "Sophie" and "Nurse" – recorded during the sessions for The Last Will and Testament of Jake Thackray in 1967. "The Blacksmith and the Toffee-Maker" was adapted by Thackray from a story from Laurie Lee's Cider with Rosie.

Track listing

Personnel
Jake Thackray - vocals, guitar
Frank Horrox - piano
Ike Isaacs - guitar
Frank Clarke - bass
Geoff Love - musical supervision

References

External links
Track listing and sleeve notes at jakethackray.com
Jake’s Progress at The Downstairs Lounge

Jake Thackray albums
1969 albums
EMI Records albums
Albums produced by Norman Newell